Hai Meri Jaan is a 1991 Indian Hindi-language film produced and directed by Roopesh Kumar. It stars Sunil Dutt, Hema Malini, Kumar Gaurav, Ayesha Jhulka, Nirupa Roy in pivotal roles.

Plot
Reshma (Hema Malini) and her younger brother Bunty (Kumar Gaurav) are orphaned at a very young age but even though they have tried to live a full life they fail to live a successful life. For this purpose, Reshma sacrifices her life, so that at least Bunty can become successful in his life but bunty falls in love with a young girl named Neelam (Ayesha Jhulka) and they later get married. Reshma welcomes them home and they try to live happily together but Neelam thinks Reshma is a very bossy woman and because of this they start to have complications in their life.

Cast
 Sunil Dutt as Telegramwala
 Hema Malini as Reshma
 Kumar Gaurav as Bunty 
 Ayesha Jhulka as Neelam
 Nirupa Roy as Neelam's Grandmother
 Roopesh Kumar

Songs
 "Tere Chehre Ko Mila Rang" - Anuradha Paudwal, Mohammad Aziz 
 "Oye Mikanto" - Anuradha Paudwal, Bappi Lahiri
 "Kahan Chali Ae Nazneen" - Mohammad Aziz
 "Ghunghat Mera Jane Kya Hua" - Asha Bhosle, Shabbir Kumar
 "Hai Meri Jaan" - Anuradha Paudwal, Bappi Lahiri
 "Maine Tumko Dil Diya Hai Jaanam" - Anuradha Paudwal, Bappi Lahiri
 "Kya Baat Hai Meri Aankhon Mein" - Anuradha Paudwal
 "He Jaanam Main Diwani Tu Diwana" - Anuradha Paudwal, Bappi Lahiri
 "Maine Tujhko" (sad) - Anuradha Paudwal, Bappi Lahiri

References

External links

 Cult of Kumar

1990s Hindi-language films
1991 films
Films scored by Bappi Lahiri